Selai Adimaitoga is a Fijian politician and a former Member of the Parliament of Fiji for the FijiFirst Party.  She was elected to Parliament in the 2018 election.

Coming from the humble beginnings of a cane farmer, Adimaitoga quickly rose to fame and is lovingly known as Pu Selai which means grandmother. Adimaitoga is a beacon to all women in Fiji and living proof that women can do anything regardless of where they come from. She came from poor beginnings and reached the Fijian Parliament.

References

Living people
I-Taukei Fijian people
21st-century Fijian women politicians
21st-century Fijian politicians
People from Tavua, Fiji
Politicians from Tavua, Fiji
Year of birth missing (living people)